The Fairchild Model 24, also called the Fairchild Model 24 Argus and UC-61 Forwarder, is a four-seat, single-engine monoplane light transport aircraft designed by the Fairchild Aviation Corporation in the 1930s. It was adopted by the United States Army Air Corps as UC-61 and also by the Royal Air Force. The Model 24 was itself a development of previous Fairchild models and became a successful civil and military utility aircraft.

Design and development
Fairchild Aircraft was hit hard by the Great Depression in the early 1930s as airline purchases disappeared. Consequently, the company attention turned to developing a reliable and rugged small aircraft for personal and business use. The Fairchild 22 became somewhat of a hit and led directly to the new and much improved Model 24 which gained rapid popularity in the early 1930s, noted for its pleasant handling characteristics and roomy interior. Having adapted many components from the automotive industry (namely expansion-shoe brakes and roll-down cabin windows), the aircraft was also affordable and easy to maintain. In production continuously from 1932 to 1948, the aircraft remained essentially unchanged aerodynamically and internally, with the addition of extra passenger seating and optional equipment. The first models were equipped with only two seats, but in 1933 a third seat was installed and by 1938 a fourth was added. The interior was first created for the Model 24 in 1937 by noted American industrial designer Raymond Loewy. A minor airframe revision was made in 1938 with the redesign of the vertical fin and redesignation from C8 to F24G onwards.

As an innovative concept, the aircraft was available with two powerplants, Warner's reliable Scarab and Fairchild's in-house 200 hp Ranger series in the F24 C8D, E and F. Initially the 1932 model Fairchild 24 C8B used a reliable and popular Warner 125 hp radial engine, and the Fairchild 24 C8C used the Warner 145 hp radial. American Cirrus III and Menasco Pirate inline engines were also occasionally used in some earlier Fairchild 24s. Later models such as the popular 24Ws upgraded to the 165 hp Warner Super Scarab.

Designed for operations from relatively unimproved grass airfields, the sturdy undercarriage construction used a vertical oil dampened cylinder above the wheel with a pivoting strut attached to the lower fuselage. The result was a complex but undeniably solid undercarriage that could absorb large shocks and was also adapted for the fitting of twin floats for water-based operations.

The sturdiness of construction of the aircraft has ensured many have survived to this day. Some suggest the massive spruce main spars can be loaded up to 10g, and while that figure is unproved, all prewar utility category aircraft were designed to withstand at least 4.1g as opposed to the 3.8g postwar design limit standard.

The Fairchild 24 built by Kreider-Reisner Aircraft, Hagerstown, Maryland, a division of Fairchild Aviation Corporation, remained in production from 1932 to 1948, essentially the same airframe but with various powerplant and configuration enhancements. In all, Fairchild constructed over 1,500 Model 24s, with an additional 280 being constructed by the Texas Engineering & Manufacturing Company (TEMCO) in Dallas when that company purchased the manufacturing rights after World War II.

Operational history

In civil use, the aircraft was a quick sales success, with prominent businessmen and Hollywood actors purchasing the aircraft. In 1936, the US Navy ordered Model 24s designated as GK-1 research and instrument trainers. The type was also used by the US Army as a light transport and by the Coast Guard, with the designation J2K-1. The Civil Air Patrol operated many Fairchild UC-61/24s, and some aircraft were fitted with two 100-pound bombs for what became successful missions against German U-boats off the east coast of the United States in the early stages of the Second World War. The UC-61 was also procured by the US Navy as the GK-1 and by the British Royal Air Force as the Fairchild Argus.

In 1941, the United States Army Air Forces (USAAF) placed an initial order for 163 Fairchild C-61s; however, via Lend-Lease, 161 of these were shipped abroad. Under the auspices of this program, the majority of the 525 Warner Scarab Fairchild 24s/C-61s went to Great Britain. Most of these aircraft saw service as Argus Is and improved Argus IIs and were allocated to a newly formed adjunct of the Royal Air Force (RAF), the Air Transport Auxiliary (ATA). An additional 306 Ranger-powered Argus IIIs were also used by the ATA. In British service, the majority of the Argus type operated with the ATA ferrying their aircrew to collect or deliver aircraft to and from manufacturers, Maintenance Units (MU)s and operational bases.

The Argus I was a Warner Scarab-equipped aircraft identified by its wind-driven generator located on the starboard struts, and was equipped with a black-painted propeller. The Argus II was also a Scarab-powered aircraft, usually with a transparent cabin roof. This mark was certified for heavier operational weight than the Mark I and was identified by its yellow propeller. The Argus III was equipped with the six-cylinder inverted inline Ranger engine.

Postwar
The aircraft was used by small air charter operators for short-distance taxi work and many were acquired by private pilot owners. It served with military forces as diverse as Finland, Thailand, Israel, Canada, the United States and Australia.

The last "new" Fairchild 24 was assembled in 1948 from a large inventory of leftover parts in Winfield, KS.

Ten Fairchild F24R aircraft operated for Comair (South Africa) during the period after the Second World War.

Civilian models

Military variants

UC-61 Argus
Military version of the Fairchild Model F24W-41 powered by a 165hp R-500-1, 161 built.
UC-61A Argus
Military version of the Fairchild Model F24W-41 with radio and 24-volt electrical system, 509 built and three impressed civilian aircraft.
UC-61B
One impressed Model 24J powered by a 145hp Warner Scarab radial.
UC-61C
One impressed Model 24R9.
UC-61D
Three impressed Model 51As.
UC-61E
Three impressed Model 24Ks.
UC-61F
Two impressed Model 24R9s.
UC-61G
Two impressed Model 24W-40s.
UC-61H
One impressed Model 24H powered by a 150hp Ranger 6-410-B.
UC-61J
One impressed Model 24-C8F two-seater, powered by a 150 hp Ranger 6-390-D3.
UC-61K Forwarder
Final production variant powered by a 200 hp L-440-7, 306 built.

UC-86
Nine impressed Model 24R-40s powered by 175 hp L-410.

GK-1
Thirteen Model 24W-40 impressed by the United States Navy.
J2K-1
United States Coast Guard version of the Model 24R, two built.
J2K-2
As J2K-1 with detailed changes, two built.
Argus I
Royal Air Force designation for the Model 24W-41 (UC-61), 118 under Lend-Lease
Argus II
Royal Air Force designation for the Model 24W-41A (UC-61 and UC-61A), 407 under Lend-Lease
Argus III
Royal Air Force designation for the Model 24R (UC-61K), 306 under Lend-Lease

Operators

Royal Australian Air Force

NAB – Navegação Aérea Brasileira 

Royal Canadian Air Force

 Czechoslovakian Security Aviation Unit

Sherut Avir
Israeli Air Force

Italian Air Force operated 4 Fairchild UC-61K Argus received from Royal Air Force from 1947 until 1951

Finnish Air Force

South African Air Force operated one aircraft 1939-1945.

Swedish Air Force

Royal Thai Air Force

Royal Air Force

United States Army Air Forces
United States Marine Corps
United States Navy
United States Coast Guard
Civil Air Patrol

Accidents and incidents
Toronto Maple Leafs NHL Hockey player Bill Barilko and his dentist Henry Hudson disappeared on August 26, 1951, aboard Hudson's Fairchild 24 floatplane, flying from Seal River, Quebec. On June 6, 1962, helicopter pilot Ron Boyd discovered the wreckage about 100 kilometres (62 mi) north of Cochrane, Ontario, about 35 miles off course. The cause of the crash was deemed to have been a combination of pilot inexperience, poor weather and overloaded cargo.

Alaskan missionary Harold L. Wood (1890-1944) died in his Fairchild 24 floatplane while landing near a logging camp at Kasaan Bay (30 miles northwest of Ketchikan, Alaska) on 24 February 1944. The cause of the crash was deemed to have been a pilot's health problem.

Surviving aircraft

 206 – Fairchild 24 W on static display at the Museum of Flight in Seattle, Washington.
 2009 – Fairchild 24-C8 on display at the EAA Aviation Museum in Oshkosh, Wisconsin.
 2724 – Fairchild 24-C8C on static display at the Hiller Aviation Museum in San Carlos, California.
 2926 – Fairchild 24 G airworthy at the Western Antique Aeroplane & Automobile Museum in Hood River, Oregon.
 2987 – Fairchild 24 G on display at the Mid-Atlantic Air Museum in Reading, Pennsylvania.
 3101 – Fairchild 24-C8F on static display at the Norfolk and Suffolk Aviation Museum in Flixton, Suffolk.
 3118 – Fairchild 24-C8F on static display at the National Museum of the United States Air Force in Dayton, Ohio.
 3224 – Fairchild 24 H on static display at the Old Rhinebeck Aerodrome in Red Hook, New York.
 3309 – Fairchild 24 K on display at the Air Zoo in Kalamazoo, Michigan.
 7033 – GK-1 on static display at the Tillamook Air Museum in Tillamook, Oregon.
 42-78040 – UC-68 airworthy at the Western Antique Aeroplane & Automobile Museum in Hood River, Oregon.
 43-14601 – UC-61A on static display at the Royal Air Force Museum Cosford in Cosford, Shropshire.
 FK338 – Argus II on static display at the Yorkshire Air Museum in Elvington, York.
 KK527 (G-RGUS) – Fairchild Argus 24 R-46A from 1944 available for private hire at Fowlmere Airfield, England
 R46-129 – Fairchild 24 R-46 on display at the Hagerstown Aviation Museum in Hagerstown, Maryland.
 R46-137 – Fairchild 24 R-46 on display at the Western North Carolina Air Museum in Hendersonville, North Carolina.
 R46-250 – Fairchild 24 R airworthy at the Canadian Historical Aircraft Association in Windsor, Ontario.
 W213 – Fairchild 24 airworthy at the Champaign Aviation Museum in Urbana, Ohio.
 W46295 – Fairchild 24 W-46 airworthy at the Combat Air Museum in Topeka, Kansas.
 Fairchild 24 C8E in storage at the Reynolds-Alberta Museum in Wetaskiwin, Alberta.
 Fairchild 24 S/N 305M-0001 Airworthy in the Fundación Aeronáutica Antonio Quintana in Madrid, Spain

Specifications (UC-61)

See also

Notes

Bibliography

External links

24
High-wing aircraft
Single-engined tractor aircraft
1930s United States civil utility aircraft
STOL aircraft
Aircraft first flown in 1932